Dichomeris bucinaria is a moth in the family Gelechiidae. It was described by Kyu-Tek Park in 1996. It is found in Taiwan.

References

Moths described in 1996
bucinaria